Kyle Wilson (born November 2, 1995) is an American football linebacker for the Hamilton Tiger-Cats of the Canadian Football League (CFL). He played college football at Arkansas State.

Professional career

Philadelphia Eagles
After going undrafted in the 2018 NFL Draft, he was signed by the Philadelphia Eagles as an undrafted free agent. He was released during the final roster cutdown on September 1, 2018. He was re-signed to the Eagles practice squad on October 2, 2018. He was released on October 16, 2018.

Los Angeles Chargers
On November 7, 2018, Wilson was signed to the Los Angeles Chargers practice squad. He was promoted to the Chargers active roster on December 13, 2018. He was released on August 31, 2019.

Hamilton Tiger-Cats
Wilson signed with the Hamilton Tiger-Cats of the CFL on May 6, 2020. After the CFL canceled the 2020 season due to the COVID-19 pandemic, Wilson chose to opt-out of his contract with the Tiger-Cats on August 25, 2020. He opted back in to his contract on December 21, 2020. In 2022, Wilson made 10 starts for the Tiger-Cats, recording 42 defensive tackles, three special teams tackles, five tackles for a loss, one forced fumble and one pass knockdown. In November 2022, Wilson signed a two-year extension with the Tiger-Cats.

References

1995 births
Living people
Players of American football from Wichita, Kansas
American football linebackers
Arkansas State Red Wolves football players
Philadelphia Eagles players
Los Angeles Chargers players
Hamilton Tiger-Cats players